Dmitry Valentinovich Nazarov (born 4 April 1990) is an Azerbaijani professional footballer who plays for  club Erzgebirge Aue and the Azerbaijan national team.

Early life
Dmitry Valentinovich Nazarov was born on 4 April 1990 in Taiynsha, then Kazakh SSR, one of the republics of the Soviet Union. His grandfather was ethnic Azerbaijani. His family moved to Germany when he was one year old.

Club career
On 7 June 2013, Nazarov signed a three-year contract with 2. Bundesliga side Karlsruher SC. On 2 July 2016, he signed a two-year contract with 2. Bundesliga side FC Erzgebirge Aue.

International career
Because Nazarov was born in Kazakhstan, he was eligible to play for the national teams of Kazakhstan and all other former Soviet Union republics. In October 2012, he was spotted by then Azerbaijan's German head coach Berti Vogts and nominated for a match against Russia on 16 October. However, he was not able to make his debut because the Azerbaijani Football Federation failed to organize the issue of his Azerbaijani passport. He finally debuted on 27 May 2014 in an away match against the United States in San Francisco.

Career statistics

Club

International

Scores and results list Azerbaijan's goal tally first, score column indicates score after each Nazarov goal.

Note: Some sources have credited Nazarov with scoring the first goal in a 2–0 victory over Faroe Islands in 2018, however this was an own-goal scored by Sonni Nattestad.

References

External links
 
 
 

1990 births
Living people
Citizens of Azerbaijan through descent
Azerbaijani footballers
Azerbaijan international footballers
German footballers
Kazakhstani footballers
Association football forwards
German people of Azerbaijani descent
German people of Kazakhstani descent
Kazakhstani people of Azerbaijani descent
Azerbaijani emigrants to Germany
Kazakhstani emigrants to Germany
Azerbaijani expatriate footballers
Naturalized citizens of Germany
Expatriate footballers in Germany
1. FC Kaiserslautern II players
Eintracht Frankfurt II players
SC Preußen Münster players
Karlsruher SC players
FC Erzgebirge Aue players
2. Bundesliga players
3. Liga players
People from North Kazakhstan Region
Converts to Islam